Blackmore is a village in Essex, England.

Blackmore or Blackmoor may also refer to:

 Blackmore (name), a surname (including a list of people with the name)
 Blackmoor, Hampshire, a village in the East Hampshire district of Hampshire, England
 Blackmoor, an area of Astley, Greater Manchester
 Blackmore, Northern Territory, an outer rural locality in Darwin, Northern Territory, Australia
 Blackmore, Shropshire, a location in England
 Blackmoor Gate, a hamlet in Devon
 Blackmoor railway station, a former station near Blackmoor Gate
 Blackmoor (campaign setting), a fantasy role-playing game setting
 Blackmoor (supplement), a 1975 supplementary rule book for the game Dungeons & Dragons
 HMS Blackmore, either of two ships
 Mount Blackmore, a mountain in Gallatin National Forest, Montana, United States
 Blackmoor (novel), a novel by Edward Hogan (writer)

See also
 Black Moor (disambiguation)
 Blackamoors (disambiguation)
 Blakemore (disambiguation)